1383 Limburgia, provisional designation , is a carbonaceous asteroid from the outer region of the asteroid belt, approximately 23 kilometers in diameter. It was discovered on 9 September 1934, by Dutch astronomer Hendrik van Gent at the Leiden Southern Station, annex to the Johannesburg Observatory in South Africa. It is named for the Dutch province Limburg.

Classification and orbit 

Limburgia is a dark C-type asteroid. It orbits the Sun at a distance of 2.5–3.7 AU once every 5 years and 5 months (1,972 days). Its orbit has an eccentricity of 0.19 and an inclination of 0° with respect to the ecliptic, which means that it is coplanar with the orbit of Earth.

Rotation period 

In December 2010, a rotational light-curve of Limburgia was obtained from photometric observations taken by James W. Brinsfield at the Via Capote Observatory  in California. It gave a rotation period of 5 hours with a brightness variation of 0.07 magnitude.

Diameter and albedo 

According to the surveys carried out by NASA's Wide-field Infrared Survey Explorer with its subsequent NEOWISE mission, Limburgia measures between 22.84 and 24.29 kilometers in diameter, and its surface has an albedo between 0.04 and 0.076, whereas preliminary figures gave a larger diameter of 25.18 and 26.66 kilometers, respectively. The Collaborative Asteroid Lightcurve Link derives an albedo of 0.0569 and a diameter of 22.18 kilometers using an absolute magnitude of 12.0.

Naming 

This minor planet was named after the Dutch province Limburg, the southernmost of the 12 provinces of the Netherlands. Naming was first cited in The Names of the Minor Planets by Paul Herget in 1955.

References

External links 
 Asteroid Lightcurve Database (LCDB), query form (info )
 Dictionary of Minor Planet Names, Google books
 Asteroids and comets rotation curves, CdR – Observatoire de Genève, Raoul Behrend
 Discovery Circumstances: Numbered Minor Planets (1)-(5000) – Minor Planet Center
 
 

 

001383
Discoveries by Hendrik van Gent
Named minor planets
19340909